Cross the Line is a 2020 Spanish thriller film directed by David Victori. It stars Mario Casas alongside Milena Smit and Elisabeth Larena.

The film won the Goya Award for Best Actor (Casas) from a total of three nominations at the 35th Goya Awards. At the 8th Feroz Awards, the film also won Best Actor, from a total of four nominations.

Plot 
Dani is a man working in a travel agency. He experiences the death of his father, outwardly dealing with the situation in a quite unperturbed manner. Upon the unexpected and unwanted entry of his sister Laura in the company's office he works in asking for a tour package, he reluctantly begins to toy with the plan of reserving a package to travel around the world. One night, a stranger, a woman, asks Dani money to pay for a burger in a bar, to which he ends up accepting. He leaves the place and the woman joins him afterwards. Accompanied by Dani, the woman breaks into a tattoo store which the woman claims to be owned by some of her friends by getting the keys of the store front's roller security shutter hidden in a water drainage channeling located nearby. Once inside, and following the woman's deactivation of the security alarm by entering the code, she tries to convince a begrudging Dani to get a tattoo. After drinking alcohol, the woman (Mila) tattoos the word '' on Dani's right arm. Mila then takes a selfie together with Dani with a Polaroid, putting the instant snapshot on a panel with other photographs.

Dani and Mila leave the place and move to an appartment, where they start having sex. An angry and violent man (Ray, Mila's boyfriend) enters the appartment threatening Dani and Mila. Ray attacks Dani, and Dani ends up attacking Ray in self-defence with a penetrating weapon, and so Ray bleeds to death. Mila, claiming that the police would be persuaded to believe Dani's good boy version instead of hers, attempts suicide by jumping out of the window. Also horrified and nervous, a hooded Dani flees from the scene. Dani asks his sister Laura (a well-connected lawyer) for help and information about what the police know about the events in the building. After finding out that the only physical evidence connecting him to the deaths is the Polaroid photograph featuring him and Mila, Dani decides to return to the tattoo store in order to remove the evidence. He activates the alarm and so the store's staff (who where just leaving the place) begin to chase him in the store, and then in the streets of Barcelona. Dani ends up prevailing. Also having learned that Mila is actually alive and badly wounded, Dani visits her hospital room. The films ends up with a deranged and blood-stained Dani being torn about what to do with Mila.

Cast

Production 
The film is a Filmax production, with the participation of TVE, TVC and Movistar+. It was shot in Barcelona.

Release 
The film had its world premiere at the 53rd Sitges Film Festival on 10 October 2020. Distributed by Filmax, it was theatrically released in Spain on 16 October 2020.

Reception 
According to the review aggregation website Rotten Tomatoes, Cross the Line has a 100% approval rating based on 5 reviews from critics, with an average rating of 7.7/10.

Ard Vijn of ScreenAnarchy was tempted to go as far as considering the film as "one of the best thrillers of recent times", praising how "refreshing" is it "to see something this well-made, straightforward rather than formulaic, seemingly flashy yet rooted in reality, and without any groan-inducing flaws or inconsistencies".

Awards

|-
| rowspan = "7" align = "center" | 2021
| rowspan=4 | 8th Feroz Awards
| colspan=2 | Best Drama Film
| 
| rowspan = "4" | 
|-
| Best Director
| David Victori
| 
|-
| Best Actor in a Film
| Mario Casas
| 
|-
| Best Original Soundtrack
| Adrian Foulkes and Federico Jusid
| 
|-
| rowspan=3 | 35th Goya Awards || Best Actor
| Mario Casas
| 
| rowspan = "3" | 
|-
| Best New Actor
| Fernando Valdivielso
| 
|-
| Best New Actress
| Milena Smit
| 
|}

See also 
 List of Spanish films of 2020

Notes

References

External links
 
 

2020 films
2020s Spanish-language films
Spanish thriller films
2020 thriller films
Films shot in Barcelona
2020s Spanish films